The Gidan Rumfa, sometimes called the Gidan Sarki ("Emir's house"), is the palace of the Emir of Kano. Located in the city of Kano, Kano State, Nigeria, it was constructed in the late 15th century. Since the reign of Rumfa, it has continuously been the residence of the traditional authority in Kano and was retained by the Fulani jihadists who took over traditional authority in Kano in the early 19th century.

History
Gidan Rumfa was built in the late 15th century on the outskirts of the town of Kano. The new building extended the reach of the town and also led to the establishment of the Kurmi market.

Architecture
The palace covers a space of about 33 acres and its open plan design is surrounded by walls up to 15 feet high. The structure is rectangular in shape and its landscape ecology can be divided into three classifications: open spaces, gardens and living quarters/built up areas. Structures within the living quarters and built up areas include the Kofar Kudu or Southern gate, offices, mosque, Soron ingila (English hall), royal courtrooms, a primary and secondary school and living quarters.

Today
Gidan Rumfa houses the Emir and his wives, children and aides. The population resident in the Emir's private quarters numbers up to 200, while more than a thousand individuals live within the structure. The space surrounding the structure is dominated by gardens.

References

Sources

Buildings and structures in Kano
Palaces in Nigeria
Sudano-Sahelian architecture